This list comprises all players who have participated in at least one league match for the former Carolina RailHawks, now North Carolina FC, since their first season in the USL in 2007. Players who were on the roster but never played a first team game are not listed; players who appeared for the team in other competitions (US Open Cup, CONCACAF Champions League, etc.) but never actually made an NASL or USL appearance are noted at the bottom of the page where appropriate.

A "†" denotes players who only appeared in a single match.

A
  Eddie Ababio
  Sola Abolaji
  Brian Ackley
  Nicholas Addlery
  Gale Agbossoumonde
  Bolu Akinyode
  Nazmi Albadawi
  Mark Anderson
  Dan Antoniuk
  Bryan Arguez

B
  Joel John Bailey
  Bradlee Baladez
  Etienne Barbara
  Danny Barrera
  Danny Barrow †
  Jake Beckford
  Drew Beckie
  Kyle Bekker
  Uriah Bentick
  Paul Black
  Matt Bobo
  Simone Bracalello
  Stuart Brightwell
  Omar Bravo
  Andriy Budnyi
  Sallieu Bundu
  Ray Burse
  Jordan Burt

C
  Jon Caldwell †
  Michael Callahan †
  Pablo Campos
  Jose Carranza
  Chris Carrieri
  Dženan Ćatić
  Marvin Ceballos
  McColm Cephas
  Ronald Cerritos
  Jacob Coggins
  Jack Coleman
  John Cunliffe
  Steven Curfman
  Braian Cyrino †

D
  Austin da Luz
  Gabriel da Silva
  Greg Dalby
  Mickey Daly
  Futty Danso
  Jun Marques Davidson
  Luciano Delbono
  Matthew Delicâte
  Jamie Dell
  Hamed Modibo Diallo
  Peabo Doue
  Chad Dombrowski
  Conor Donovan

E
  Connally Edozien
  Cory Elenio
  César Elizondo
  Tyler Engel
  Gareth Evans
  Donovan Ewolo

F
  Brian Farber
  Wuilito Fernandes † 
  Franco Figueroa †
  Jamie Finch
  Akira Fitzgerald
  Matt Fondy
  Dre Fortune
  Floyd Franks
  Santiago Fusilier

G
  Josh Gardner
  Jason Garey
  Bryan Gaul
  John Gilkerson
  Hunter Gilstrap
  Stephen Glass
  Jonathan Glenn
  Gavin Glinton
  Scott Goodwin
  Renan Gorne
  Jordan Graye
  Jonathan Greenfield
  Mike Grella
  Austin Guerrero
  Aaron Guillen
  Eddie Gutierrez

H
  Paul Hamilton
  Michael Harrington
  Aly Hassan
  David Hayes
  Tom Heinemann
  Neil Hlavaty

I
  Christian Ibeagha

J
  Daniel Jackson
  Julius James
  Kevin Jeffrey
  Mark Jonas

K
  Joseph Kabwe
  Henry Kalungi
  Marcel Kandziora
  Jeremy Kelly †
  Aaron King
  Austen King
  Brad Knighton
  John Krause
  Luke Kreamalmeyer
  Philip Kutsu

L
  Lance Laing
  Tyler Lassiter
  Gabe Latigue
  Marcio Leite
  Chris Lemons
  David Lilly
  Marios Lomis
  Phillip Long
  Kupono Low
  Amir Lowery
  Bernhard Luxbacher
  Matt Luzunaris

M
  Ross Mackenzie
  Anthony Maher
  Matthew Maher
  James Marcelin
  Alex Martínez
  Enzo Martínez
  Rey Ángel Martínez
  Chris McClellan
  Devon McKenney
  Tony McManus
  Simon Mensing
  Cory Miller
  Steven Miller
  Nick Millington
  Alex Molano
  Kareem Moses
  Tim Murray †

N
  Caleb Norkus
  Nacho Novo
  Martin Nuñez
  Chris Nurse
  Mamadee Nyepon

O
  Ciaran O'Brien
  John O'Hara
  Jonathan Orlando
  Bréiner Ortiz
  Leo Osaki

P
  Mike Palacio
  Daniel Paladini
  Caleb Patterson-Sewell
  Richard Perdomo
  Álex Pérez
  Nicolas Platter
  Brian Plotkin

R
  Eric Reed
  Gregory Richardson
  Daniel Ríos
  Paul Ritchie
  Macklin Robinson
  Saeed Robinson
  Bradley Ruhaak
  Brad Rusin
  Allan Russell
  Kevin Rutkiewicz

S
  Ramak Safi
  Devon Sandoval
  Frank Sanfilippo
  David Sartorio
  Luke Sassano
  Daryl Sattler †
  Zack Schilawski
  Billy Schuler
  Mark Schulte
  Daniel Scott
  Mauricio Segovia
  Greg Shields
  Ty Shipalane
  Brian Shriver
  Graham Smith
  Ryan Solle
  Ben Speas
  Toni Ståhl
  Jonny Steele
  Jack Stewart
  Sam Stockley
  David Stokes
  Brian Sylvestre

T
  Alexandros Tabakis
  Nick Taitague
  D. J. Taylor
  Nick Thompson
  Wells Thompson
  Connor Tobin
  Jeremy Tolleson

W
  Blake Wagner
  Jamil Walker
  Kenney Walker
  Konrad Warzycha †
  Kwame Watson-Siriboe
  Matt Watson
  Justin Willis
  Daniel Woolard
  Joey Worthen

Z
  Nick Zimmerman
  Nathan Zuzga

Sources

North Carolina FC
 
Association football player non-biographical articles